You Nasty is the twelfth studio album by American rapper Too Short. It was released on September 12, 2000, via Jive Records, making it his ninth release on the label. Audio production was handled by Ant Banks, Erick Sermon, and Jazze Pha. You Nasty proved to be a success, peaking at #12 on the Billboard 200 and #4 on the Top R&B/Hip-Hop Albums, as well as producing two charting singles, "2 Bitches" and "You Nasty", which peaked at #2 and #6 on the Hot Rap Singles respectively, It was certified Gold.

Track listing

Charts

References

2000 albums
Too Short albums
Albums produced by Ant Banks
Albums produced by Erick Sermon
Albums produced by Jazze Pha
Jive Records albums